The 1982–83 Illinois State Redbirds men's basketball team represented Illinois State University during the 1982–83 NCAA Division I men's basketball season. The Redbirds, led by fifth year head coach Bob Donewald, played their home games at Horton Field House and were members of the Missouri Valley Conference.

The Redbirds finished the season 24–7, 13–5 in conference play to finish in second place. They were the number one seed for the Missouri Valley Conference tournament as Wichita State University, who finished first in the conference season, were serving the second of a two-year probation and therefore prohibited from postseason competition. They won the championship game over the University of Tulsa.

The Redbirds won the conference autobid to the 1983 NCAA Division I men's basketball tournament. They were assigned to the Mideast Regional as the number six seed and lost to Ohio University in the first round.

Roster

Schedule

|-
!colspan=9 style=|Regular Season

|-
!colspan=9 style=|Missouri Valley Conference {MVC} tournament

|-
!colspan=9 style=|National Collegiate Athletic Association {NCAA} tournament

References

Illinois State Redbirds men's basketball seasons
Illinois State
Illinois State